In probability theory and computer science, a log probability is simply a logarithm of a probability. The use of log probabilities means representing probabilities on a logarithmic scale, instead of the standard  unit interval.

Since the probabilities of independent events multiply, and logarithms convert multiplication to addition, log probabilities of independent events add. Log probabilities are thus practical for computations, and have an intuitive interpretation in terms of information theory: the negative of the average log probability is the information entropy of an event. Similarly, likelihoods are often transformed to the log scale, and the corresponding log-likelihood can be interpreted as the degree to which an event supports a statistical model. The log probability is widely used in implementations of computations with probability, and is studied as a concept in its own right in some applications of information theory, such as natural language processing.

Motivation
Representing probabilities in this way has several practical advantages:

 Speed. Since multiplication is more expensive than addition, taking the product of a high number of probabilities is often faster if they are represented in log form. (The conversion to log form is expensive, but is only incurred once.)  Multiplication arises from calculating the probability that multiple independent events occur: the probability that all independent events of interest occur is the product of all these events' probabilities.
 Accuracy. The use of log probabilities improves numerical stability, when the probabilities are very small, because of the way in which computers approximate real numbers.
 Simplicity. Many probability distributions have an exponential form. Taking the log of these distributions eliminates the exponential function, unwrapping the exponent. Log probabilities make some mathematical manipulations easier to perform.

Representation issues 
The logarithm function is not defined for zero, so log probabilities can only represent non-zero probabilities. Since the logarithm of a number in  interval is negative, often the negative log probabilities are used. In that case the log probabilities in the following formulas would be inverted. 

Any base can be selected for the logarithm.

Basic manipulations 

The product of probabilities  corresponds to addition in logarithmic space.

 

The sum of probabilities  is a bit more involved to compute in logarithmic space, requiring the computation of one exponent and one logarithm.

However, in many applications a multiplication of probabilities (giving the probability of all independent events occurring) is used more often than their addition (giving the probability of at least one of them occurring). Additionally, the cost of computing the addition can be avoided in some situations by simply using the highest probability as an approximation. Since probabilities are non-negative this gives a lower bound. This approximation is used in reverse to get a continuous approximation of the max function.

Addition in log space

 

This also produces the correct behavior if one of the operands is floating-point negative infinity, which corresponds to a probability of zero.

  This quantity is indeterminate, and will result in NaN.
  This is the desired answer.

This should be checked for separately to return .

For numerical reasons, one should use a function that computes  (log1p) directly.

See also
 Information content
 Log-likelihood

Probability
Mathematics of computing